Merced is an underground station on Line 1 of the Mexico City Metro. It is located in the Venustiano Carranza borough, slightly to the east of the centre of Mexico City. The station building was designed by Félix Candela, and it was opened on 4 September 1969. Starting 11 July 2022, the station will remain closed for at least eight months for modernization work on the tunnel and the line's technical equipment.

Iconography
The station logo depicts a box with apples. Its name is taken from the surrounding area, where La Merced Monastery once stood. Outside the station is the La Merced Market – one of the largest in the city, second only to the Central de Abasto down in Iztapalapa borough.

General information
Metro Merced is connected with the interior corridors of the market. It has a baggage-o-meter, like Metro Autobuses del Norte and Metro Terminal Aérea. Outside the market are other markets, such as Mercado de Sonora, and wholesale outlets that sell plastic goods, bags, shoes, electronics, and some general stores. This station is located near Avenida Anillo de Circunvalación.

Nearby
La Merced Market, traditional public market.
Mercado de Sonora, city-established traditional market.

Exits
West: Avenida Anillo de Circunvalación and Plaza Carrizal, Merced
East: La Merced Market, Merced Balbuena

Ridership

References

External links 
 

Merced
Railway stations opened in 1969
1969 establishments in Mexico
Mexico City Metro stations in Venustiano Carranza, Mexico City
Accessible Mexico City Metro stations